PC-SAFT (perturbed chain SAFT) is an equation of state that is based on statistical associating fluid theory (SAFT). Like other SAFT equations of state, it makes use of chain and association terms developed by Chapman, et al from perturbation theory. However, unlike earlier SAFT equations of state that used unbonded spherical particles as a reference fluid, it uses spherical particles in the context of hard chains as reference fluid for  the dispersion term. 

PC-SAFT was developed by Joachim Gross and Gabriele Sadowski, and was first presented in their 2001 article. Further research extended PC-SAFT for use with associating and polar molecules, and it has also been modified for use with polymers. A version of PC-SAFT has also been developed to describe mixtures with ionic compounds (called electrolyte PC-SAFT or ePC-SAFT).

Form of the Equation of State
The equation of state is organized into terms that account for different types of intermolecular interactions, including terms for
 the hard chain reference
 dispersion
 association
 polar interactions
 ions
The equation is most often expressed in terms of the residual Helmholtz energy because all other thermodynamic properties can be easily found by taking the appropriate derivatives of the Helmholtz energy.

Here  is the molar residual Helmholtz energy.

Hard Chain Term

where
  is the number of compounds;
  is the mole fraction;
  is the average number of segments in the mixture;
  is the Boublík-Mansoori-Leeland- Carnahan-Starling hard sphere equation of state;
  is the hard sphere radial distribution function at contact.

References

Engineering thermodynamics